The Brigance Inventory of Early Development ii (IED-ii) is a child development assessment. It is designed to provide information on how a child is performing in 5 key norm-referenced/standardized developmental areas:
 Language Domain (receptive and expressive)
 Motor Domain (gross motor and fine motor skills)
 Academic-Cognitive (general/quantitative and pre-reading skills)
 Daily Living Domain (self-help and prevocational)
 Social-Emotional Domain (play skills and behavior and engagement/initiation skills)


Test
The inventory provides information in 11 criterion-referenced, skill-based developmental areas: 
 Perambulatory Motor Skills and Behaviors
 Gross-Motor Skills and Behaviors
 Fine-Motor Skills and Behaviors
 Self-help Skills
 Speech and Language Skills
 General Knowledge and Comprehension
 Social-Emotional Development
 Early Academic Skills Sections
 Readiness
 Basic Reading Skills
 Manuscript Writing
 Basic Math

See also
Albert Brigance
Denver Developmental Screening Tests

References

Child development
Developmental disabilities
Pediatrics